John Sandlin may refer to:

John N. Sandlin (1872–1957), American lawyer, jurist, and politician
Johnny Sandlin (1945–2017), American recording engineer and record producer